Pak Hon-yong (28 May 1900 – 18 December 1955) was a Korean independence activist, politician, philosopher, communist activist and one of the main leaders of the Korean communist movement during Japan's colonial rule (1910–1945). His nickname was Ijong (이정) and Ichun (이춘), his courtesy name being Togyong (덕영).

During the Japanese occupation of Korea, he tried to organize the Korean Communist Party. When the Japanese authorities cracked down on the party, he went into hiding. After Korea's liberation, August 1945, he set up the Communist Party of Korea in the South, but under pressure from American authorities he moved to North Korea (then People's Committee of North Korea) in April 1948. He attended a meeting with Kim Gu and Kim Kyu-sik on the subject of Korean reunification.

On record, he collaborated with Kim Il-sung in the Korean War. Park Hun-young was surprised by the strength of President Syngman Rhee's crackdown. Rhee massacred Southern dissenters, as in the Jeju Uprising, the Mungyeong Massacre and the Bodo League Massacre. In 1955, on account of the defeat in the Korean War, he was sentenced to forfeiture of all property and death. Although the Soviet Union and China tried to dissuade Kim Il-sung from executing Pak, Pak was eventually executed for the fabricated accusation of being an American spy.

Life

Early life
Pak was born to a yangban family of the Yeonghae Park lineage in Sinyang-myeon, Yesan County, Chungcheongnam-do. However, he was the illegitimate son of a concubine.

In 1919, he graduated from Kyŏngsŏng Ordinary High School, now Kyunggi High School. In March 1919, he was involved in the March 1st Movement and later independence movements.

Political activities 
In 1921, he joined the Shanghai branch of the Communist Party of Korea, Irkutsk faction. At this time, he was secretary of the Korean Communist Youth League. In January 1922, he participated in the Comintern Far East People's Representative Council in Moscow.

Pak Hon-yong was arrested in Korea in April 1922 and was charged with being a Communist Party organizer. He was released in 1924 and became active as a reporter for the newspapers Dong-a Ilbo and Chosun Ilbo.

Underground
On 18 April 1925, Pak Hon-yong became one of the founders of the Communist Party of Korea. From this point until the end of World War II his activities were clandestine.

In 1926, he appeared in court. During the trial, he feigned insanity and ate feces, with the result that he was acquitted in November of that year. Afterwards, he was confined to his home due to his supposed ill-health, but in December he escaped by way of Manchuria to reach the Soviet Union. It was only then that the Japanese realized that he was feigning madness.

In the Soviet Union, he was educated in the International Lenin School, returning home in 1940. Back in Korea, he was active in the resistance to Japanese rule.

After World War II

Late in August 1945, the Communist Party of Korea(조선 공산당) was re-established, having been officially disbanded in 1928, and Pak became its secretary. On 5 January 1946, as its representative, he announced at a foreign and domestic press conference that, supporting the decision of the Moscow conference of great powers (UK, US, Soviet Union), Korea was now in the process of a "democratic revolution". After the Moscow Conference (1945), his organization the Communist Party of Korea had been oppressed by United States Army Military Government.

In September 1946, he was instrumental in organising a general Strike, which at its peak involved more than a quarter of a million workers.

In December 1946, he organized the Workers Party of South Korea known as (남로당), and became one of two vice chairmen.

South and North Korea negotiations and life in North Korea 

In April 1948, he visited North Korea for negotiations, along with Kim Gu and Kim Kyu-sik. In May 1948, the negotiations ended, and he remained in the North.

In September 1948, while keeping his role as secretary of the Workers' Party of South Korea, he became Deputy Prime Minister and Foreign Minister of the newly established North Korea.

Pak Hon-yong became secretary of the Workers' Party of Korea when the North and South parties united in April 1950. Pak was the vice chairman of the Politburo of the DPRK from 1949 to 1953, and Foreign Minister of the DPRK until he was ousted and arrested in 1953.

Korean War 

According to secret documents of the former Soviet Union released in succession until 2002, Kim Il-sung and Park Hun-young always acted together until the detailed plans of the war were finally decided. Kim Il-sung and Park Hun-young were also on hand during their visit to Moscow from 30 March to 25 April 1950, when they were approved for war by Stalin. During the visit, Kim Il-sung and Park Hun-young met Stalin and received written instructions of detailed war plans.

Arrest and death

Pak Hon-yong was arrested on 3 August 1953 in a purge of the formers members of the Workers' Party of South Korea (mainly domestic faction) by Kim Il-sung. On 15 December 1955, he was sentenced to death for espionage. The date of Pak's death is uncertain, though sources suggest that he was executed that same month.

Works 
 Modern society and our duty 
 Historical viewed of Christian inner

See also
Communist Party of Korea
Workers' Party of South Korea
Workers' Party of Korea
Kim Gu
Kim Il-sung
Kim Kyu-sik
Kim Won-bong
Lyuh Woon-hyung
Korean independence movement
Politics of North Korea

References

External links

Korea Times article by Andrei Lankov 
Brief profile
Pak Hon-Yong:Nate
 남로당지도자 박헌영 자료집 내는 아들 圓鏡스님
 아버지 전집 펴내는 ‘박헌영 아들’ 원경스님
 "박헌영이 미제 간첩? 제국주의와 맞서 싸운 애국자" 오마이뉴스 2010년 01월 04일자
 부러져버린 ‘인민의 고무래’ 박헌영 ① 경향신문
 부러져버린 ‘인민의 고무래’ 박헌영 ② 경향신문
 이정식 교수, '여운형은 박헌영파에 암살' 주장 - 동아일보 매거진

1900 births
1955 deaths
20th-century executions by North Korea
People from Yesan County
Korean communists
Korean Marxists
Korean independence activists
Executed communists
Executed politicians
Executed revolutionaries
People executed by North Korea by firing squad
Executed North Korean people
Executed South Korean people
Korean revolutionaries
Leaders of the Workers' Party of Korea and its predecessors
Workers' Party of South Korea politicians
Communist Party of Korea politicians
Korean expatriates in China
Korean expatriates in the Soviet Union
People granted political asylum in the Soviet Union
Foreign ministers of North Korea
Members of the 1st Supreme People's Assembly
Vice Chairmen of the Workers' Party of Korea and its predecessors
Members of the 1st Central Committee of the Workers' Party of South Korea
Members of the 2nd Central Committee of the Workers' Party of Korea
Members of the 1st Political Committee of the Workers' Party of South Korea
Members of the 1st Standing Committee of the Workers' Party of South Korea
Members of the 2nd Political Committee of the Workers' Party of Korea
Members of the 2nd Standing Committee of the Workers' Party of Korea
International Lenin School alumni